Kurdul (Tsakhur: Курдул-Лек) is a rural locality (a selo) in Gelmetsinskoye Rural Settlement, Rutulsky District, Republic of Dagestan, Russia. The population was 267 as of 2010. There is 1 street.

Geography 
Kurdul is located 37 km northwest of Rutul (the district's administrative centre) by road. Gelmets and Mikik are the nearest rural localities.

Nationalities 
Tsakhur people live there.

References 

Rural localities in Rutulsky District